Philadelphia, Wilmington and Baltimore Railroad Bridge No. 1 was a swing steel through truss that spanned the Schuylkill River between Philadelphia, Pennsylvania's Kingsessing and Grays Ferry neighborhoods.  

Part of a long succession of ferry and bridge crossings at this location, the bridge was built in 1901 for the Philadelphia, Wilmington and Baltimore Railroad by American Bridge Company. Over the decades, ownership of the bridge passed to PW&B successor railroads: the Philadelphia, Baltimore & Washington Railroad, then to Penn Central, then to Conrail, which formally placed it out of operation in 1976.  

In 2017, Conrail conveyed the bridge to the City of Philadelphia, part of a plan to extend the multiuse Schuylkill River Trail. The bridge's truss and superstructure were demolished in August 2018, with the pilings spared to serve as a foundation for a planned bike-pedestrian bridge.

Background (to 1901)

The bridge's location has been a major crossing point since the establishment of a ferry here as early as 1673 and certainly by 1696. In 1777, British troops built a pontoon bridge here during their occupation of Philadelphia, and the newly independent Americans subsequently kept it up, replacing parts as necessary after floods. In 1838, the PW&B built the first permanent bridge here to complete the first direct rail link from Philadelphia to Wilmington, Delaware, and Baltimore, Maryland. Called the Newkirk Viaduct, it was a covered wooden bridge that carried a road as well as one track. The bridge did not initially allow locomotives to pass so the cars were (at least until 1844) pulled by horses over the river and northward along three miles of track to the terminus of the PW&B. A new draw span was constructed in 1891, but maintenance remained difficult for the rest of the decade.

In 1901, when the city of Philadelphia opened an adjacent highway bridge, it absolved the PW&B of the responsibility of carrying the road traffic, and the railroad promptly began building the PW&B Bridge No. 1.

Design and construction (1901-1902)
The bridge has a  swing span pivoting on a cylindrical stone pier at mid-stream. A wooden pile fender protects the pivot pier and the opened swing span from collisions with boat traffic on the river. The American Bridge Company built the swing span on the fender in its open position, avoiding interference with river traffic. The swing span sits between two  approach spans. "The mechanism, located on the swing span and driven by steam, is typical of movable bridge construction at the turn of the twentieth century," wrote historian Justin Spivey.

It was completed and opened in 1902.

Operation and abandonment (1902-1976)

In 1976, Conrail abandoned the bridge shortly after it acquired the Pennsylvania Railroad properties, and left it permanently open.

Post-abandonment (1977-present)
An unknown party purchased the bridge in 1987. 

In 2012, Philadelphia Mayor Michael Nutter proposed to return the bridge to service as a part of the Schuylkill River Trail, a bike trail. Under the proposal, the bridge would be raised some  so that boats — in particular, a towboat used to bring oil barges to the Trigen power plant upstream — could pass without swinging it open.

In May 2016, councilmember Kenyatta Johnson introduced a bill in Philadelphia City Council to allow the city to acquire the bridge and some surrounding land from Conrail.

In November 2017, Conrail transferred ownership of the bridge to the City of Philadelphia, which planned a $13 million project to replace the truss with a bike-trail structure.

On August 23, 2018, the bridge's truss and superstructure were demolished. The pilings remain as a foundation for the planned bike-pedestrian bridge.

See also

List of bridges documented by the Historic American Engineering Record in Pennsylvania
List of crossings of the Schuylkill River

References

External links

"The River As It Was, The River As It Is, The River As It Should Be" By John Frederick Lewis of the City Parks Association, Philadelphia, 1924.
1924 photo labeled "The Present State of the East Bank of the Schuylkill at Gray's Ferry Where Our Citizens Met Washington on His Way to His Inauguration."
1924 photo labeled "Looking down the River, East Bank, Below Gray's Ferry Where Our Citizens Assembled to Greet Washington."
1969 PRR traffic schematic for PW&B No. 1 Bridge
Timelapse video of the 2018 removal of the bridge superstructure.

Bridges in Philadelphia
Bridges completed in 1902
Bridges over the Schuylkill River
Historic American Engineering Record in Philadelphia
Swing bridges in the United States
Truss bridges in the United States
Pennsylvania Railroad bridges
Steel bridges in the United States
Railroad bridges in Pennsylvania
Bridge No. 1